Petar Kostadinov (born 1 April 1978) is a former Bulgarian footballer who played as a midfielder.

Playing style
Kostadinov possesses a rare combination of exceptional physical strength as well as outstanding endurance.  He is a hardy defender in midfield.  His hard work during play, although usually unspectacular, has made him the kingpin in all the teams he has played for.

Career
Born in Dimitrovgrad Kostadinov began played football in local team FC Dimitrovgrad. On 21-years old signed with Chernomorets Burgas and made his debut in A PFG - The Bulgarian first football division. He signed a 3-year deal with Cherno More Varna after being released from Chernomorets in 2003. He has been given the №18 shirt.
In 2006 Kostadinov renewed your contract with "the saylors" for additional three years. In June 2008 Kostadinov was transferred to Beroe Stara Zagora.

Statistics

Honours

Club
 Cherno More
Bulgarian Cup:
Runner-up (2): 2005-06, 2007-08
 Beroe
Bulgarian Cup:
Winner: 2009-10

External links
 Profile at beroe.eu

Bulgarian footballers
1978 births
Living people
Association football midfielders
First Professional Football League (Bulgaria) players
FC Chernomorets Burgas players
PFC Cherno More Varna players
PFC Beroe Stara Zagora players
People from Dimitrovgrad, Bulgaria
Sportspeople from Haskovo Province